The 1946–47 League of Ireland was the 26th season of senior football in the Republic of Ireland.

Cork United were the defending champions.

Changes from 1945–46
No new teams were elected to the League.

Teams

Season overview 
Shelbourne won their fifth title, their first in three years.

Table

Results

Top goalscorers

See also 

 1946–47 FAI Cup

Ireland
Lea
League of Ireland seasons